Lunice Creek is a  tributary of the South Branch Potomac River, belonging to the Potomac River and Chesapeake Bay watersheds.  The creek is located in Grant County, West Virginia. Lunice Creek is created by its North and South Forks and empties into the South Branch at Petersburg.

The creek's name most likely is a corruption of Looney('s), the name of an early soldier or settler.

Tributaries
Tributary streams are listed in order from north to south.

North Fork Lunice Creek
Saltblock Run
Shell Run
Opossum Hollow Run
South Fork Lunice Creek
Big Star Run
Little Star Run
Bodkins Run
Brushy Run
Norman Run
Robinson Run

See also
List of West Virginia rivers

References

Rivers of Grant County, West Virginia
Rivers of West Virginia
Tributaries of the Potomac River